The Welfare Reform Act 2007 (c.5) is an Act of the Parliament of the United Kingdom which alters the British social security system. A number of sections come into force two months after royal assent and the first commencement order made under the Act specified that section 31 came into force on 1 November 2007.

The green paper
The green paper is available as a .pdf document from the links at the end of the article.

The Government's objectives for the Act, as stated in the green paper were to:
Reach 80% employment amongst all people of working age (it was just shy of 75% when the paper was released).
To reduce the numbers claiming incapacity benefit by 1 million (from 2.7 million at the time). This was later stated to be achieved "within a decade" 
To help 300,000 lone parents back into work.
To increase the number of older workers, aged fifty or over, in work by 1 million.

Provisions, aims and criticisms of the Act

The Act is wide-ranging and affects a large swathe of the population, particularly those dependent on housing benefit and those suffering from physical and mental ill health and disability.

Changes to provision of Housing Benefit
The Local Housing Allowance method of assessing benefit will be applied across the de-regulated private rented sector nationwide.

Currently housing benefit is sent directly to landlords, not the tenants. The Act will change this so that rent money is paid to the tenant who will then be expected to pay this to the landlord. One of the stated motivations for this change is that it will give tenants an appreciation of the sums involved in their benefit claims and this will foster greater social responsibility. Criticism of this change has focused on vulnerable people such as drug addicted people (who may find the temptation of finding alternative uses for the money too great to withstand) and those with mental health problems (who may find the new responsibility difficult or impossible to fulfil).

The Act also introduces a housing benefit sanction for those who are found guilty of anti-social behaviour; benefit can be withdrawn and/or the tenants can be evicted.

Abolition of Incapacity Benefit

The Act replaces Incapacity Benefit with a new benefit, Employment and Support Allowance. The new benefit will require that regular effort be made by (non-exempted) claimants to seek work or take part in work-related assessments and regularly meet with an advisor. Those failing to do so may see a reduction of their benefit.

The medicals carried out to see who is eligible for the benefit will be made more stringent.

Criticism of the changes has been broad. Charities working with vulnerable people have welcomed the Government's pledge to assist the disabled into work but are concerned that there is a lack of funding for this support and that, in the end, there will be more coercion than help. Critics are broadly in agreement that employers remain very wary of taking on disabled or mentally ill people and much more needs to be done to change this.

Older people and single mothers
The stated aims of the legislation were to increase the numbers of older people (50+) and single mothers in employment - two groups that face particular difficulties in returning to work.

See also
Welfare Reform Act

References

External links
The Welfare Reform Act 2007, as amended from the National Archives.
The Welfare Reform Act 2007, as originally enacted from the National Archives.
Explanatory notes to the Welfare Reform Act 2007.

Parliamentary documents and debates timeline

Structure
The links in this section include only primary documents relating to the debate within Parliament.

''They are carefully laid out in the following manner; they are firstly ordered  chronologically and then bulleted according to document type:
Headings
Hansard transcriptions of debates.
Parliamentary briefing documents and other primary sources.

Documents
Leading up to legislation
Lords - debate on 2001 Queen's Speech which included proposals for welfare reform - 25 June 2001
Commons - debate on Welfare Reform and Incapacity Benefit (pressure is increasing for the release of a Green Paper) - 22 November 2005
Green Paper
The Green Paper: The new deal for welfare: Empowering people to work. (PDF)
Commons - debate on the Welfare Reform Green Paper - 24 January 2006
House of Commons Work and Pensions Committee - Incapacity Benefits and Pathways to Work - Volume II: Oral and Written Evidence - 26 April 2006
Inquiry into Incapacity Benefits and Pathways to Work (PDF)
Bill: Commons Second Reading
Commons - second reading - 24 July 2006
Mind (mental health charity) - parliamentary briefing - second reading (PDF).
Disability Consortium (comprising RNIB, RNID, MENCAP, Scope and others) - parliamentary briefing - Second Reading - 24 July 2006
Age Concern parliamentary briefing - 24 July 2006 (PDF)
Citizen's Advice Bureau - parliamentary briefing - Second reading: House of Commons - 5 January 2007
Lords - debate on the Queen's Speech which included proposals for welfare reform - 21 November 2006
Committee
Committee Stage - 28-30 November 2006
Bill: Commons Third reading
Commons - debate on clause 3 'assessment of limited capability for work' - 9 January 2007
Commons - debate on clause 7 'participation on work-focused interviews - 9 January 2007
Commons - debate on clause 8 'limited capability for work' - 9 January 2007
Commons - debate on clause 29 'local housing allowance' - 9 January 2007
Commons - debate on clause 35 'supply of information by rent officers' - 9 January 2007
Lords - First Reading
Lords - first reading - 10 January 2007
Northern Ireland Assembly - debate - 23 January 2007
The assembly debates the motion "That this Assembly expresses deep concern about the implications of the Welfare Reform Bill, particularly the introduction of a new coercive regime into benefit administration, and its impact on a number of vulnerable groups, including neurological patients." The motion passes.
Lords - Second Reading
Lords - second reading  - 29 January 2007
Citizen's Advice Bureau - parliamentary briefing - Second reading: House of Lords - 2 February 2007
Macmillan Cancer Support - Parliamentary briefing - 14 February 2007
Lords - 5 March 2007
The Freud Report: ‘Reducing Dependency, Increasing Opportunity: options for the future of welfare to work,’ - 5 March 2007
Lords Report Stage - 19 March 2007
Lords - clause 1 'employment support allowance'
Lords - clause 10 'work focused health related assessments'
Lords - clause 25 'parliamentary control'
Citizen's Advice Bureau parliamentary briefing - Report stage: House of Lords - 23 March 2007
Bill: Lords Third Reading - 27 March 2007
Lords - clause 11 'work focused health related assessments'
Commons - Lords amendment no.1 - 2 May 2007
Undated: Barnardos' response to welfare new deal (PDF)

Press: Opinion pieces and editorials
No more talk of scroungers. It's a victory for civilisation. - Polly Toynbee, The Guardian - January 10, 2006.
"Now No 10 is in danger of sounding tougher than the Tories who have just demanded incapacity benefits should not be slashed."
A shocking failure of courage and realism that continues to damage our society. - The Daily Telegraph - January 25, 2006.
"a shocking failure of the British body politic, a failure of courage and realism. And it continues to be profoundly damaging to the character of British society."
A doleful tale from which no one benefits - Libby Purves - The Times - March 6, 2007.
"those who brandish carrots and sticks and hair-clippers must understand that often their enemy is a fatalistic state of mind which, though unhelpful, is explicable."

United Kingdom Acts of Parliament 2007
Social security in the United Kingdom